The Phantom of Soho (German: Das Phantom von Soho) is a 1964 West German thriller film directed by Franz Josef Gottlieb and starring Dieter Borsche, Barbara Rütting and Hans Söhnker. It was based on a novel by Bryan Edgar Wallace and was part in a large group of British-set thrillers made in Germany at the time, many of them adapted from the works of Wallace's father Edgar Wallace.

It was shot at the Spandau Studios in Berlin and on location in London. The film's sets were designed by the art directors Hans Jürgen Kiebach and Ernst Schomer.

Cast
 Dieter Borsche as Chief Inspector Hugh Patton
 Barbara Rütting as Clarinda Smith
 Hans Söhnker as Sir Philip
 Peter Vogel as Sergeant Hallam
 Helga Sommerfeld as Corinne Smith
 Werner Peters as Dr. Dalmer
 Hans Nielsen as Lord Harold Malhouse
 Stanislav Ledinek as Gilard, club manager
 Otto Waldis as William B. Clover, man with birthmark
 Hans W. Hamacher as 	Capt. Muggins
 Emil Feldmann as Papa Red
 Harald Sawade as Charlie
 Kurt Jaggberg as Jussuf
 Elisabeth Flickenschildt as Joanna Filiati

References

Bibliography 
 Bergfelder, Tim. International Adventures: German Popular Cinema and European Co-Productions in the 1960s. Berghahn Books, 2005.

External links 
 

1964 films
West German films
German thriller films
1960s thriller films
1960s German-language films
Films directed by Franz Josef Gottlieb
Films shot in London
Films set in London
Films based on British novels
Films shot at Spandau Studios
Gloria Film films
1960s German films